

Summary

June, July, August

After a frustrating 2013–14 season Levski found themselves in 5th position and missing participation in European competitions for the first time since 1990. The disappointing season lead to the release of a lot of players mainly foreigners with big salaries. Those releases were a result of the club's bad financial condition. Stanislav Angelov announced his retirement from professional football after a friendly game against SS Lazio which marked the 100th anniversary of the club. Vladimir Gadzhev and Dimitar Makriev's contracts were not renewed while players like Kevin Bru, Larsen Touré, Rafael Bastos, Cristóvão da Silva Ramos, Pavel Čmovš, Ricardo Nunes and Dustley Mulder were released on free transfers.

On 19 May club legend Georgi Ivanov returned to the club as a Sports director and announced the club plans to change the transfer policy and sign only local players. As a result of that ex-Levski players Valeri Domovchiyski, Borislav Stoychev and Lachezar Baltanov returned to the club. Ivanov also made some changes in the staff releasing the chief scouts Doncho Donev and Kiril Vangelov. Club icon Daniel Borimirov was appointed as head of the Youth department.

On 5 June 2014 Georgi Ivanov announced the appointment of the Spanish manager José Murcia as the head coach of the team. The contract would be for a 2-year time. This was the first time in the club's history when a Spanish coach is in charge of Levski Sofia. 'Pepe' Murcia is going to be the 13th foreign coach to lead the Blues in their 100 years of history. The appointing of Murcia bring some more changes in the staff at Levski which included hiring methodologist David Serano for the Youth academy. As the pre-season started Pepe Murcia appointed Valeri Bojinov as the new captain of the team. Former player Dimitar Telkiyski also joined the club being appointed as youth coach and assistant of Georgi Todorov at the new formed U-21 team of the club.

In the first day of July Vladimir Gadzhev returned to the club and signed a new 1-year contract after failing to find a new club abroad in which to continue his career. On 8 July attacking midfielder Miguel Bedoya signed a 2-year contract with the club. 10 days later Levski signed with another Spanish player Añete. Bedoya and Añete are the 3rd and 4th Spanish players to play for the club after Toni Calvo and Alejandro Pérez. Veselin Minev also returned to the club signing a 2-year contract which wasn't accepted well from the fans and at the friendly game against Haskovo the supporters swore at the left back.  In the meantime 18-year-old youngster from the Academy Deyan Ivanov signed his first professional contract with the club. The defender will stay with the Blues until 2017.

Levski Sofia finished their pre-season preparation with 3 wins, 2 draws and 1 loss. The Blues started the campaign with a home 1-1 draw against Lokomotiv Plovdiv on 19 July. On 27 July Levski suffered their 5th lost derby in-a-row after a 0-2 loss against CSKA Sofia. A week later the Blues secured their first win of the season beating Lokomotiv Sofia with 1-0 after a goal scored by Roman Procházka. However a few days later manager Pepe Murcia was released  and sports director Georgi Ivanov took in charge being Director and head coach at the same time. This was the 4th time in history when Ivanov is taking charge as head coach of the first team.

The first game under the management of Georgi Ivanov was away against Beroe in Stara Zagora. Levski lost 2-1 after 2 mistakes by goalkeeper Stefano Kunchev which led to his release from the club. After the match Georgi Ivanov announced that from 1 January 2015 Dimitar Dimitrov will take charge as head coach of the club. The following round Levski snatched a late 2-1 win against Botev Plovdiv with goals scored by Vladimir Gadzhev and Luis Pedro in the last seconds. The match was played in front of empty stands due to a punishment from the Bulgarian Football Union. On 25 August Levski suffered a heavy 3-0 loss in their visit against Litex Lovech. In the end of the game Levski Sofia fans clashed with the local police which led to a further 2-match ban of playing in front of an empty stadium with no spectators.

September and October

On 1 September Levski secured a second late win in-a-row after beating 1-0 Cherno More Varna with a penalty scored by Valeri Bojinov in 90+4. After the game Georgi Ivanov announced that the team needs a new central forward. During the first week of September Mauricio Gómez, Alexis Allart and Najib Ammari were offered trials at the club. All of them took part in the friendly game against Botev Vratsa won 2-0. Ammari was offered a contract while Gomez and Allart were released from their trials. In the meantime Valeri Bojinov left the club to join Serie B side Ternana. After the 2 week break Levski won another late win against Slavia Sofia followed by a 4-1 away victory against Haskovo. The team also started their campaign in the Bulgarian Cup with a smashing 7-1 away win against Spartak Varna. On 27 September Levski beat Ludogorets against the odds with 3-2 making it their 3rd ever win against the UEFA Champions League participant. Miguel Bedoya scored his first two goals for the Blues with Georgi Sarmov adding the third one. The team won 5 games in total during September.

During the month of October Levski made some disappointing results managing not to win a single game. Draws were made in the away games against Marek and Lokomotiv Plovdiv with a last minute equaliser scored by Martin Kamburov. The bad form continued with another loss in the derby against CSKA Sofia with 0-3. The disappointment for the fans continued with a shocking 0-2 loss against Second Division side Montana for the Bulgarian Cup placing the team in an uncomfortable position before the re-match in the beginning of December.

November and December

In the beginning of November Levski recorded their first win for over a month with a 1-0 away victory against Lokomotiv Sofia. In the following round The Blues were again punished to play in front of empty stands against Beroe Stara Zagora. Georgi Ivanov's side lost 0-1 finding themselves placed 5th after 18 rounds. On 23 November Levski marked their first win in Plovdiv against Botev since 2009. The 3-0 victory was followed by a 2-2 home draw against Litex. The Blues managed to come back from a 2-goal difference in the Bulgarian Cup and won against Montana 4-0 which qualify them for the Quarterfinals of the tournament. Despite that Levski finished the year 2014 with 2 losses in-a-row against Cherno More Varna and Slavia Sofia. The team  finished the year 2014 placing 6th in the Championship.

In the winter break it was expected for Dimitar Dimitrov to take in charge the team as announced by the sports manager Georgi Ivanov. Eventually both sides didn't came out with an agreement and Ivanov was forced to look for another coach option. On 22 December 2014 Stoycho Stoev was announced as the new Levski Sofia manager. Stoev signed a 2.5-year deal while Ivanov came back to the Sports Director position.

January and February

During the winter break Levski released several players like Plamen Krumov, Anton Ognyanov and others. While Miroslav Ivanov's contract expired and youngster Aleksandar Lyubenov was sent on loan to Septemvri Simitli. The first incoming transfer to arrive was right back Aleksandar Aleksandrov from Cherno More Varna. In the days afterwards the club signed with goalkeeper Bojan Jorgačević and defender Emil Ninu.

The team started the mid-season preparation with an 8-0 win against Vihren Sandanski. After that the team went to Turkey for their training camp during the winter break. They started with a draw against Vorskla Poltava and a 3-0 win against UEFA Europa League participators Qarabağ FK. The team managed to lose only once to Slovak side Spartak Myjava and made 4 more draws against Lech Poznań, Milsami Orhei, Petrolul Ploiești and Karpaty Lviv. While the game against Armenian Ulisses FC was interrupted due to clashes and fights between the players of both teams. The team finished the training camp in Turkey with 1 win, 5 draws and 1 loss. Valeri Domovchiyski scored 10 goals in total in the friendlies.

During the training camp the club managed to sing on loan Somali winger Liban Abdi from Turkish side Rizespor. 10 days before the renewing of the season Levski signed with Polish striker Lukasz Gikiewicz making him the first ever Polish player to play for the club.

The team started 2015 with a 3-0 win against Haskovo in a first leg Quarterfinal of the Bulgarian Cup. Valeri Domovchiyski confirmed his good form by scoring 2 goals while Tihomir Trifonov scored and own goal to fix the final score. Bojan Jorgacevic, Emil Ninu, Liban Abdi and Lukasz Gikiewicz made their official debut for the club in this match.

Levski started their campaign in A Group with a smashing 8-0 win against Haskovo. Valeri Domovchiyski scored a brace and assisted for one more goal notching a total of 11 goals for the season . Spanish playmaker Antonio Salas Quinta also scored twice and made 2 assists, while new signing Liban Abdi made 3 assists in total. Miguel Bedoya and Bozhidar Kraev also scored and Polish striker Lukasz Gikiewicz scored his first goal for the club making the final score 8-0. This was the biggest win in the championship for Levski since 2007.

March, April and May

In March Levski played their Quarterfinal's 2nd leg against Haskovo and made a 1-1 draw. With an aggregate score of 4-1 "The Blues" qualified for the Semifinals of the Bulgarian Cup. On 8 March Levski lost 0-1 against Ludogorets Razgrad after a mistake from goalkeeper Plamen Iliev that led to the goal. Although Levski won against Marek Dupnitsa in the last round they were surpassed by Botev Plovdiv who won 3 out of 3 games and Levski played in the relegation group of the championship during the playoffs. The Blues finished 7th which equaled their anti-record. The only other time in history when Levski Sofia finished at 7th place was in season 1937–38.

Transfers

Summer transfers

In:

Out:

See List of Bulgarian football transfers summer 2014

Winter transfers

In:

Out:

See List of Bulgarian football transfers winter 2014–15

Squad

Updated on 26 May 2015.

Statistics

 Note – players not in bold had left the team during the season.

Goalscorers

Assists

Cards

Friendlies

Summer

Mid-season

Winter

Competitions

Overall

A Group

First phase

Results summary

Results by round

Matches

Relegation group

Results summary

Results by round

Matches

Bulgarian Cup

First round

Levski advance to Second round.

Second round

Levski advance to Quarterfinals.

Quarterfinals

Levski advance to Semifinals.

Semifinals

Levski advance to Final.

Final

References

External links 
 2014–15 Levski Sofia season

PFC Levski Sofia seasons
Levski Sofia